Alfred Tristram Metcalfe (December 31, 1852 – September 2, 1914) was a professional baseball player for the 1875 New York Mutuals.

References

External links

1852 births
1914 deaths
Baseball players from New York (state)
Sportspeople from Brooklyn
Baseball players from New York City
19th-century baseball players
Major League Baseball third basemen
New York Mutuals players
Burials at Cypress Hills Cemetery